The Panfilov District is a district of Chüy Region in northern Kyrgyzstan. The administrative seat lies at Kayyngdy (Kaindy). The district covers the westernmost part of the Chüy Region, and a mountainous exclave separated from the rest of the Panfilov District by the Jayyl District.

Population

Rural communities and villages
In total, Panfilov District includes 1 city and 20 settlements in 6 rural communities. Each rural community includes one or several villages. The rural communities and settlements in the Panfilov District are as follows:

city Kayyngdy (town of district significance)
Frunze (seat: Chaldybar; incl. Cholok-Aryk and Chorgolu)
Kurama (seat: Panfilov; incl. Jayylma, Orto-Aryk and Efironos)
Kürpüldök (seat: Kürpüldök; incl. Kirov and Rovnoye)
Ortoev (seat: Telman; incl. Bukara and Kum-Aryk)
Chaldybar (seat: Birinchi May; incl. Ozernoye, Oktyabr and Oyrondu)
Voznesenovka (seat: Voznesenovka; incl. Orto-Kayyrma and Erkin-Say)

References 

Districts of Chüy Region